Kozice may refer to:

 Kozice, Stolac, a village near Stolac, Bosnia and Herzegovina
 Kozice (Gornji Vakuf), a village near Gornji Vakuf-Uskoplje, Bosnia and Herzegovina
 Kozice, Croatia, a village near Slatina, Croatia
 Kozice, Garwolin County, a village in Masovian Voivodeship, east-central Poland
 Kozice, Gostynin County, a village in Masovian Voivodeship, east-central Poland
 Kozice, Kočevje, a former village in the Municipality of Kočevje, Slovenia
 Kozice, Lower Silesian Voivodeship, a village in south-west Poland
 Kozice, Sierpc County, a village in Masovian Voivodeship, east-central Poland
 Kozice (Wałbrzych), a city district of Wałbrzych in Lower Silesia, Poland